Tom T. Choi (born in Daegu, South Korea) is a Korean-American actor best known for Teen Wolf and his voice work on the Mortal Kombat video games and the first season of Squid Game. He has acted in numerous movies and television programs. Choi is also a producer, director, and writer. Tom Choi wrote the screenplay and starred in the award-winning short film: Lone Hunter.

Early life 
Choi was born in Daegu, South Korea and moved to Des Moines, Iowa when he was four years old. After graduating high school, Choi moved to Seattle, Washington, where he graduated from the University of Washington with a bachelor's degree in Drama. He then moved to Los Angeles and continued acting in film, television, and commercials. He attended the LACC School of Cinema and Television and now produces, directs, and writes in addition to acting.

Career 
Choi began working in film and television in 1998. He has made appearances in multiple blockbuster films and network television shows, and is best known for his roles as Ken Yukimura in Teen Wolf and Liu Kang in the Mortal Kombat series.

He runs the independent production company Tension Films and was elected in 2015 and 2017 as a board member for the Los Angeles local of SAG-AFTRA, the union's largest local.

As a filmmaker and writer
He made a short film called Singularity in 2016.

Choi has claimed there are not many film and television roles for Asian Americans. Tom Choi wrote the screenplay for Lone Hunter, and then starred in the short film.

Choi also has a web site called Tension Films to feature his work as a filmmaker and writer.

Personal Life

He married Jill Renninger and has a son.

Filmography

Film

Television

Video games

Awards 
In 2015, Choi was nominated for Best Actor at the Maverick Movie Awards for the Tension Films short film Lone Hunter. In 2017, he was nominated for Best Actor and won the Jury Prize for Best Short Film at the Milledgeville Film Festival for Lone Hunter, shared with John Heinsen and Pascal Leister.

In 2016, he received an Honorable Mention at Justin Lin's Interpretations Short Films Initiative in the NBCUniversal Short Film Festival for Singularity. Choi both directed the film and played the leading role.

References

External links 
 
 Tension Films Official website

American male film actors
American male television actors
American male video game actors
American male voice actors
American male actors of Korean descent
Living people
Year of birth missing (living people)
20th-century American male actors
21st-century American male actors
People from Daegu